The Lone Ranger and the Lost City of Gold is a 1958 American Western film in Eastmancolor released by United Artists. The second of two theatrical features specifically based on and continuing the TV show The Lone Ranger it stars Clayton Moore and Jay Silverheels, reprising their roles from the TV series. The first feature film was 1956's The Lone Ranger.  No further films based on this specific version of the characters were made after this one.

Plot
Three Indians were brutally murdered by a gang of hooded outlaws. Each one possessed a silver medallion, which were sections cut off from a large silver plaque which served as a treasure map to a secret location where a large amount of gold is reputedly stashed. Two more medallions are unaccounted for, and The Lone Ranger (Clayton Moore) and his friend Tonto (Jay Silverheels) must use all their resources to intercept the gang, prevent further carnage and save the owners of the medallions.

Cast

 Clayton Moore as The Lone Ranger
 Jay Silverheels as Tonto
 Douglas Kennedy as Ross Brady 
 Charles Watts as Sheriff Oscar 
 Noreen Nash as Mrs. Frances Henderson
 Ralph Moody as Padre Esteban 
 Lisa Montell as Paviva
 John Miljan as Chief Tomache
 Dean Fredericks (as Norman Fredric) as Dr. James Rolfe
 Maurice Jara as Redbird
 Bill Henry as Travers, Brady's henchman shot by Brady
 Lane Bradford as Brady's henchman shot by the Lone Ranger

See also
 List of American films of 1958

References

External links
 
 
 
 

1958 films
1958 Western (genre) films
Lone Ranger films
1950s English-language films
American Western (genre) films
Films directed by Lesley Selander
Films scored by Les Baxter
1950s American films